Mmm, Mmm, Mmm is the 1997 debut of the Las Vegas soul music band Home Cookin', featuring fourteen tracks. Track nine, Soul Space Express, appeared on Road Rash: Jailbreak and the television series Cupid, while X-Rated Superstar was a number one hit. The success of this song warranted the release of a racy music video. The band's second and final album, Pink in the Middle, was released three years later.

Track listing
All tracks written and performed by Home Cookin'.
 X-Rated Superstar
 Hold Tight
 Against the Grain
 All Talk
 Somebody
 Needle's Sing
 Golden Rule
 Had a Feelin'
 Soul Space Express
 Words
 Rock It Man
 Cricket
 Shine It On
 Second Guess

Personnel

Dave Baker - Electric guitar
Steve Barclay - Bass guitar
Russell Burt - Tenor saxophone
Jason Colby - Trumpet 
Steve Dawson - Baritone saxophone
Hal Floyd - Bass guitar
Frank Klepacki - drums
Fito Ruiz - Bones
Rob Mader - Alto saxophone
Joe Malone - percussion
Dave Philippus - Bones
Jordan Robins - vocals
Rob Stone - Alto saxophone
Daryl Williams - Bass guitar
Anthony Jones- Bass guitar

References

External links
Frank Klepacki's website, featuring information on the band
The Connextion

1997 debut albums
Home Cookin' (band) albums